Catherine Clare Dalton (born 24 October 1992) is an Irish cricketer who currently plays for Essex in English domestic cricket. She plays as a right-handed batter. Dalton gained Irish citizenship in 2015, and was subsequently named in the Irish national team's squad for the 2015 World Twenty20 Qualifier in Thailand. She made her Twenty20 International debut in the tournament's final, against Bangladesh, and went on to make 4 appearances in One Day Internationals and 4 in Twenty20 Internationals for Ireland in 2015 and 2016. She has previously played for Middlesex in England and Typhoons in Ireland.

Biography

Catherine Dalton is a fast bowler and top order batswoman who spent 2011 and 2012 on the England Academy. A former West Ham United and recent Tottenham Hotspur footballer, Dalton has focused her efforts on cricket and was rewarded with selection on the prestigious International Cricket Camp, in Potchefstroom, South Africa in 2009.

After a brilliant year with Essex, where she averaged in excess of 100 with the bat in 2010, she was rewarded with selection for the ECB Academy at Loughborough. The ECB has always looked upon Dalton as a fast bowler though as shown with her selection for the England Women's Academy team to tour South Africa in April 2012.

At domestic level, following a lack of opportunities for Essex at county level in 2011, Dalton moved across to play for Middlesex in 2012 and Finchley Women. She plays men's cricket for Hutton CC in Essex.

In 2013, she was named as Middlesex Player of the Year at an awards dinner at Lord's. She finished 5th in the ECB National Batting Averages, and the only non-full International in the Top 10. However, despite this, she didn't gain further England recognition.

Playing for Halstead men's team against Felixstowe on 29 May 2015, Catherine became the first female on record to score a 100 in The Two Counties men's cricket leagues

By the end of the 2015 season, Dalton had gained her Irish citizenship and chosen to commit her International future to Ireland. She was initially called up for the World Cup Qualifiers in Thailand before playing for Ireland in the T20 ICC World Cup in India in 2016.

In 2019 she returned to play at Essex where she opens the batting. In an ECB Premier League match for Finchley CC, she hit an unbeaten 214 vs Bishop's Stortford - ac competition record.

She is a current ECB Level 3 coach and has a 1st Class Honours Degree from St Mary's University College, London. She is also assistant coach at The Ultimate Pace Foundation that has hosted camps in Bangalore, Delhi, Gurgaon, Pune & Hyderabad.

Recently she was appointed as a Bowling Coach of the Rajasthan Cricket Association becoming the first female to have such an honour bestowed for men's cricket.

She is Assistant Head Coach of The National Fast Bowling Academy, which is based at Herts & Essex Cricket Centre, Sawbridgeworth.

References

External links

1992 births
Living people
People from Leyton
Irish women cricketers
Ireland women One Day International cricketers
Ireland women Twenty20 International cricketers
Essex women cricketers
Middlesex women cricketers
Typhoons (women's cricket) cricketers